Doto greenamyeri is a species of sea slug, a nudibranch, a marine gastropod mollusc in the family Dotidae.

Distribution
This species was described from 20 m depth at Samarai Island in Kwato Channel, Milne Bay Province, Papua New Guinea. It is also known from Indonesia.

Description
The body of this nudibranch is translucent white with pink ovotestis visible in mature individuals. There is a longitudinal stripe of brown pigment along the midline of the back which bifurcates on the head and leads to the brown rhinophores. The cerata are distinctive in shape, without tubercles but with a series of raised rings on their outer faces. They have bushy white pseudobranchs on the inner faces and the raised rings have brown lines at their apices, edged by orange. The maximum length of this species is 15 mm.

EcologyDoto greenamyeri'' is found on colonies of an aglaopheniid hydroid.

References

Dotidae
Gastropods described in 2015